Pul or PUL may refer to:

 Pul (coin), historical Russian copper coin
 Pul, Iran, a village in Mazandaran Province, Iran
 Pul, Kerman, a village in Kerman Province, Iran
 Afghan pul, one 1/100th of the Afghan afghani (currency)
 Pul, alternative name of the Assyrian king Tiglath-Pileser III
 Polyurethane laminate
 Pregnancy of unknown location, a form of ectopic pregnancy that cannot be located through ultrasound imaging
 Premier Ultimate League, a women's professional ultimate disc league
 Press Union of Liberia
 Presses universitaires de Louvain, the publisher of the University of Louvain in Louvain-la-Neuve, Belgium
 Protestant, unionist, loyalist people in Northern Ireland